The 1985 Australian Drivers' Championship was a CAMS sanctioned Australian motor racing title open to racing cars complying with Formula Mondial. It was the 29th Australian Drivers' Championship and the fourth to be contested by Formula Pacific-based Australian Formula 1 cars or by the similar Formula Mondial cars. The championship winner was awarded the 1985 CAMS Gold Star.

Tasmanian driver John Bowe successfully defended his 1984 Australian Drivers' Championship crown in his Ralt RT4  Ford. Bowe dominated, winning the first four rounds of the series to take a twelve-point victory over Peter Hopwood (Ralt RT4 Ford). Peter Macrow (Cheetah Mk.8 Ford) was a very distant third in the series, only moving into the position when he won the final round at Sandown Park.

Calendar

The championship was contested over a five-round series with one race per round.

Points system
Championship points were awarded on a 9-6-4-3-2-1 basis to the first six placegetters at each round.

Championship results

References

External links
 Image of the Ralt RT4/85 of championship winner John Bowe at the Oran Park round, primotipo.com, as archived at web.archive.org

Australian Drivers' Championship
Drivers' Championship